RING finger and CHY zinc finger domain-containing protein 1 is a protein that in humans is encoded by the RCHY1 gene.

Function 

The protein encoded by this gene has ubiquitin-protein ligase activity. This protein binds with p53 and promotes the ubiquitin-mediated proteosomal degradation of p53. This gene is oncogenic because loss of p53 function contributes directly to malignant tumor development. Transcription of this gene is regulated by p53. Alternative splicing results in multiple transcript variants encoding different isoforms.

Interactions 

RCHY1 has been shown to interact with P53 and Androgen receptor.

References

Further reading